The Ministry of Culture and Sport (MCD) is the department of the Government of Spain responsible for the promotion, protection and dissemination of the Spanish historical heritage, national museums, art, books, reading and literary creation, of cinematographic and audiovisual activities and of national archives and libraries.

It is also responsible for the promotion and dissemination of culture in Spanish, as well as the promotion of cultural cooperation and, in coordination with the Ministry of Foreign Affairs, European Union and Cooperation, of international relations in the field of culture. Likewise, the MCD is responsible for the proposal and execution of the government' policy on sport.

The MCD is headed by the Culture Minister, a Cabinet member who is appointed by the Monarch on advice of the Prime Minister. Like the Ministry of Agriculture, it does not have any Secretariat of State and is organized through a General Secretariat (with the rank of undersecretariat) and the Ministry's undersecretariat. The National Sports Council is also part of the Ministry. The current Minister of Culture and Sport, since 12 July 2021, is Miquel Iceta.

History

Early period 
The Ministry of Culture was created during the Spanish transition to democracy. However, the government action on culture dates back to the 18th century. From the beginning of the century and promoted by the Crown, it appeared the first Royal Academies such as the Language (1713), History (1738) or Fine Arts (1752), all of them dependent from the Secretariat of State.

With the development and specialization of the Administration, the promotion and protection of culture was assumed by the Ministry of Development between 1834 and 1837 when it assumed powers over theaters, and all kinds of public amusements and recreation, as well as the Conservatories of Arts and Music, by the Ministry of the Interior between 1837 and 1847 and Development again between 1847 and 1851, by the Ministry of Grace and Justice between 1851 and 1855 and again by the Ministry of Development until 1900.

The Budget Act of 1900 created the Ministry of Public Instruction and Fine Arts which assumed the responsibilities on culture until 1977. During this period, the Directorate-General for Fine Arts was created in 1915 which had competences on civil constructions related to National Monuments, Museums, Artistic Schools, Painting, Music Schools and other entities of an artistic nature and in 1939 it was created the Directorate-General for Archives and Libraries. Both merged in 1974 in a new Directorate-General for Artistic and Cultural Heritage.

In 1946 it was created the Directorate-General for Cinematography and Theater which main task was to censor this cultural sectors. It was suppressed in 1967.

Democracy 
Finally, in 1977 it was created an independent Culture Ministry which assumed the Directorate-General for Artistic and Cultural Heritage from the Ministry of Education, the responsibilities of the Under Secretary for Family, Youth and Sport from the Ministry of the Presidency and the information and cultural functions of the Ministry of Information and Tourism (cinema, theaters, music). Likewise, the Secretariat of State for Culture was created and it also assumed RTVE.

The final structure established nine general directions: Artistic Heritage, Archives and Museums; Cultural Diffusion; Books and Libraries; Music Theater and Shows; Cinematography; Community Development; Youth; and Broadcasting and Television. It also assumed organically the Superior Council of Sports.

In 1981 the Ministry ceded to the City of Madrid the management of the Teatro Español. In 1985 the Ministry suffered a big reshuffle because of the devolution of cultural powers to the recently created Regions. At the same time it was created the National Institute of Performing Arts and Music (INAEM) and the Institute of Cinematography and Audiovisual Arts (ICAA).

Between 1996 and 2004 the Ministry of Culture was merged with the Ministry of Education although the Secretariat of State for Culture was maintained. In 2004 it was created again and in 2011 the Ministry assumed the competencies on bullfighting. It was suppressed again in 2011 until 2018 when the new prime minister Pedro Sánchez recovered this Ministry.

Structure
The Ministry's structure is:

The General Secretariat for Culture and Sport.
The Directorate-General for Books and Promotion of Reading.
 The Deputy Directorate-General for the Promotion of Books, Reading and Spanish Literature.
 The Deputy Directorate-General for Library Coordination.
The Directorate-General for Cultural Industries, Intellectual Property and Cooperation.
 The Deputy Directorate-General for the Promotion of Cultural Industries.
 The Deputy Directorate-General for Intellectual Property.
 The Deputy Directorate-General for Cultural Cooperation with the Autonomous Communities.
 The Directorate-General for Cultural Heritage and Fine Arts.
 The Deputy Directorate-General for the Management and Coordination of Cultural Assets.
 The Deputy Directorate-General for Records and Documentation of Historical Heritage.
 The Deputy Directorate-General for the Institute of Cultural Heritage of Spain.
 The Deputy Directorate-General for State Museums.
 The Deputy Directorate-General for State Archives.
The Technical Cabinet.
The Deputy Directorate-General for International Relations and European Union
 The National Sports Council (CSD).
 The Directorate-General for Sports.
 The Deputy Directorate-General for High Competition.
 The Deputy Directorate-General for Sports Promotion and Innovation.
 The Deputy Directorate-General for Women and Sport.
 The Deputy Directorate-General for the Sport Legal Regime.
 The General Secretariat.
 The President's Cabinet.
 The Deputy Directorate-General for Professional Sports and Financial Control.
 The Press Office.
 The Undersecretariat of Culture and Sport.
 The General Technical Secretariat.
 The Budget Office.
 The Deputy Directorate-General for Economic Management and General Affairs.
 The Deputy Directorate-General for Human Resources and Services Inspection.
 The Technical Cabinet.
 The Information Technology Division.

Public organisms under direction of Ministry of Culture and Sport:
 The Reina Sofía Museum.
The Prado Museum.
 The National Library of Spain.
 The National Institute of Performing Arts and Music.
The Institute of Cinematography and Audiovisual Arts.
The Spanish Anti-Doping Agency.

List of officeholders
Office name:
Ministry of Culture and Welfare (1977)
Ministry of Culture (1977–1996; 2004–2011)
Ministry of Culture and Sports (2018–present)

Awards given out
Established in 1975 and first presented in 1976, the Ministry of Culture awards the Miguel de Cervantes Prize each year to honor the lifetime achievement of an outstanding writer in the Spanish language.

See also 

 Right to science and culture
 Right to education
 Welfare rights
 Economic, social and cultural rights
 Culture minister

Notes

References

External links
 Official site of the Spanish Ministry of Culture (in Spanish)

Culture
Culture
Spain
Culture